Darren Douglas Phillip (born March 18, 1978) is an American professional basketball player.  Phillip a.k.a. "Primal Fear" is also a well known streetball player on the basketball courts of the New York City summer leagues. He was the 2000 NCAA Division I men's basketball season rebounding leader.

College career
Born in London, England, he attended high school in Brooklyn, New York, later playing college basketball at Fairfield University in Connecticut. At Fairfield, he was a two-time First Team All-MAAC selection.  As a senior, Phillip led the nation in rebounds per game (14.0 rpg), while tallying a nation-leading 24 double-doubles including 19 straight to end the season and posting a MAAC single game record 25 rebounds in the team's win over Marist College.  As a freshman, Phillip was a starter on the Stags team which held a half time lead over the number 1 seed University of North Carolina Tar Heels before falling short in the 1997 NCAA Men's Basketball Championship tournament.  Phillip received his bachelor's degree in communications from Fairfield University in 2000.

Professional career
Phillip was invited to the Philadelphia 76ers summer camp in 2000. Not offered a guaranteed contract, Phillip opted to sign a two-year guaranteed contract with CB Málaga, a team based in Málaga, Andalusia that plays in Spain's top league, the Asociación de Clubs de Baloncesto.  After playing six years in Spain with three different teams, Phillip signed with the Strong Island Sound of the American Basketball Association in 2006.  Phillip lead the league with 12.5 rebounds per game while tallying 10 double-doubles in 13 games.  In December 2006, Phillip returned to Spain to play his seventh season with CAI Zaragoza.

Five years later, in September 2011, he signs for Ford Burgos.

Streetball career
Phillip has a long-standing reputation as being one of the best big men in the New York City summer hoops circuit, winning numerous championships and awards at Hoops In the Sun at Orchard Beach in the Bronx, Nike Pro City and EBC Rucker Park.  Phillip is known in cage and throughout the city as Primal Fear.

Phillip's streetball resume includes team champions of the 2001 Hoops in the Sun; 2002, 2003, 2004 and 2006 EBC Rucker Park; 2004, 2005, 2007 Nike Pro City; 2006 and 2007 Brooklyn Nike Pro City; 2004 and 2005 West 4th Street; and the 2004, 2005, 2006 Original Rucker tournaments. And he was MVP of the 2005 EBC Rucker Park, 2007 Nike Brooklyn Pro City, 2007 Nike Pro City, and the 2004 and 2005 Original Rucker tournaments.  Phillip appeared in the "EBC at Rucker Park: Season Two" DVD released in 2002.

See also
List of NCAA Division I men's basketball season rebounding leaders

References

External links
CAI Zaragoza Profile
Nike Basketball Article
StreetBallin.net Profile
Jack Jones, "Basketball superstar Darren Phillip '00: boundless rebounder," Campus Currents, March 2000.

1978 births
Living people
African-American basketball players
American expatriate basketball people in Argentina
American expatriate basketball people in Chile
American expatriate basketball people in Spain
American men's basketball players
Atléticos de San Germán players
Basket Zaragoza players
Baloncesto Málaga players
CB Girona players
Ciclista Olímpico players
English expatriate sportspeople in Spain
Fairfield Stags men's basketball players
Juventud Sionista basketball players
Leones de Ponce basketball players
Liga ACB players
Piratas de Quebradillas players
Power forwards (basketball)
Quimsa basketball players
Real Betis Baloncesto players
Sportspeople from Brooklyn
Street basketball players
Basketball players from New York City
Basketball players from Greater London
21st-century African-American sportspeople
20th-century African-American sportspeople